The 1950 Southern Conference baseball tournament was held in Greensboro, North Carolina, from May 26 through 28, as the conference's final event of the 1950 NCAA baseball season. This was the league's first baseball championship tournament, and predates modern Southern Conference baseball records which begin with the 1954 baseball season. The South Division's top seed  won the tournament. Despite Wake Forest's win,  participated in the District III Playoffs, falling in both games against Southeastern Conference foes.

The tournament used a double-elimination format.

Seeding 
The top two teams from each division participated in the tournament. Complete standings are not available, but the teams below all fielded baseball teams within the Southern Conference.

Bracket

References 

Southern Conference Baseball Tournament
Tournament